Tõstamaa is a small borough in Pärnu municipality, Pärnu County, southwestern Estonia. Tõstamaa has a population of 466 (as of 1 January 2020).

Tõstamaa St. Mary's Lutheran church was built in 1763–1768.

Tõstamaa Manor
Tõstamaa Manor was first mentioned in 1553 as Testama, when it belonged to the Bishop of Ösel–Wiek. Later the owners have been the Kursells, Helmersens and Staël von Holsteins. The Early-Classical two-storey main building was built in 1804. During a renovation in 1997, several original painted ceilings were uncovered.  The manor was dispossessed in 1919 and since 1921 a local school (Tõstamaa Keskkool) is operating in the main building. The most famous inhabitant of the manor is probably orientalist Alexander von Staël-Holstein, who grew up and spent his childhood at the manor.

Notable people
Ellinor Aiki (1893-1969), painter, born in Tõstamaa
Urmas Eero Liiv (born  1966), film director, born in Tõstamaa
Artur Uritamm (1901–1982), composer, born in Tõstamaa

Gallery

References

External links
Tõstamaa Parish 
Tõstamaa Manor
Tõstamaa Manor at Estonian Manors Portal
Tõstamaa high school

Boroughs and small boroughs in Estonia
Manor houses in Estonia
Kreis Pernau